Little Apookta Creek is a stream in the U.S. state of Mississippi. It is a tributary to Apookta Creek.

Apookta is a name derived from the Choctaw language meaning "doubled".

References

Rivers of Mississippi
Rivers of Attala County, Mississippi
Mississippi placenames of Native American origin